Weldon is a village in the Canadian province of Saskatchewan within the Rural Municipality of Kinistino No. 459 and Census Division No. 15. The area is part of the aspen parkland biome.

History 
Weldon incorporated as a village on January 24, 1914.

2022 stabbings

On the morning of Sunday, 4 September 2022, multiple people were stabbed in Weldon and the nearby James Smith Cree Nation. A total of twelve people were killed, and eighteen others were injured. One of the two suspects - they were brothers - was found dead the next day. The second suspect was captured on September 7, but died while in custody. On October 6, the RCMP said there was evidence that one suspect was solely responsible for all eleven homicides, including his brother's.

Demographics 

Attractions 
The village has a seniors citizens lodge, a seniors club, a riding club, a winter recreation centre, an auditorium/gymnasium complex, a public library, a furnished summer sports field and worship centres for one denomination as well as a non-denominational assembly. The community is known for its old growth tree-lined streets and the natural environment of the farmland in the parkland region.

Many of the residents trace their lineage back to Norwegian settlers who first established the community just after the turn of the 20th century. Weldon's senior residents hold strong links to their roots in Norway and every May 17 a large "Syttende Mai" celebration is a significant cultural event in the village. The village's population grew fivefold during its 2005 Homecoming Celebrations held during the Canada Day weekend.

The Weldon Grain Elevators have garnered attention from the online community of the video game Team Fortress 2 due to their resemblance to the map 2Fort.

See also 
 List of communities in Saskatchewan
 Villages of Saskatchewan

References

External links
Weldon Village Council
Saskatchewan City & Town Maps
Saskatchewan Gen Web - One Room School Project 
Post Offices and Postmasters - ArchiviaNet - Library and Archives Canada
Saskatchewan Gen Web Region
Online Historical Map Digitization Project
GeoNames Query 

Villages in Saskatchewan
Kinistino No. 459, Saskatchewan
Division No. 15, Saskatchewan